The 1996 Kentucky Wildcats football team represented the University of Kentucky in the 1996 NCAA Division I-A football season. The Wildcats scored 138 points while allowing 322 points; they opened the season with 1 win and 6 losses, and then after the firing of head coach Bill Curry was announced, the Wildcats won three straight SEC games before losing their final game to finish 4–7.

Season
Kentucky opened with a 38–14 loss to Louisville, then lost 24–3 at Cincinnati due to repeated special teams breakdowns.  A game in a driving rainstorm against Indiana remained a scoreless tie until the final seconds when a Kentucky field goal led to a 3–0 win.  A 65–0 loss at Florida and 35–7 loss at Alabama were followed by Kentucky blowing a second half lead to lose 25–14 to South Carolina.  After a 41–14 loss at LSU, Kentucky stood at 1–5 on the season and the firing of head coach Bill Curry was announced.  The Wildcats responded by reeling off three victories in a row: 24–17 against Georgia, 24–21 against Mississippi State and 25–0 against Vanderbilt.  A 56–10 loss to Tennessee ended the season with the Wildcats at 4–7.

Kentucky's victories over Georgia and Mississippi State kept those two teams out of bowl games, as each finished 5–6 due to their losses to Kentucky.  Kentucky's 25–0 shutout of Vanderbilt on November 16 was the team's first shutout since a 21–0 win against #25 Ole Miss on October 2, 1993.  Kentucky played four road games against ranked teams in 1996.  Kentucky's three game SEC win streak (Georgia, Mississippi State and Vanderbilt) was its first since 1993 (South Carolina, Ole Miss, LSU).  This was the first college season for highly touted freshman quarterback Tim Couch, who later went on to be a finalist for the Heisman Trophy and was the #1 overall pick in the 1999 NFL Draft.

Schedule

Roster

Team players in the 1997 NFL Draft

Postseason
Leading rusher Derick Logan, the SEC Freshman Player of the Year, did not return.  Head coach Bill Curry was replaced by Hal Mumme.  Sometime-starting quarterback Billy Jack Haskins transferred to Rhode Island after Mumme announced that Tim Couch would take the starting spot.

References

Kentucky
Kentucky Wildcats football seasons
Kentucky Wildcats football